Mirza Rafi ud-Darajat (Persian: میرزا رفیع الدین درجات)(1 December 1699 – 6 June 1719), the youngest son of Rafi-ush-Shan and the nephew of Azim-ush-Shan, was the eleventh Mughal Emperor. He was placed on the throne by the Sayyid Brothers of Barha, after they had executed the previous emperor Farrukhsiyar and had made themselves the badishahgar(king-makers).

Reign

Syed Brothers
As previous emperor Furrukhsiyar was deposed by syed brothers.                                                       Rafi ud-Darajat owed his throne to the Syed Brothers took full advantage of this. They wanted him to be a puppet ruler and so took steps to curtail his power.

Rival claim to throne
The reign of Rafi ud-Darajat was one of turbulence. On 18 May 1719, less than three months after his own accession, Rafi ud-Darajat's uncle, Nekusiyar, assumed the throne at the Agra Fort as he thought he was more eligible for the post.

The Syed Brothers were extremely determined to defend the emperor they had raised to the throne and punish the offender. They swiftly succeeded. Only three months after Nekusiyar's enthronement, the fort surrendered and Nekusiyar was captured. He was respectfully received by the Amir ul-Umara and confined at Salimgarh where he died in 1723.

Death
Before dying, Rafi ud-Darajat requested that his elder brother be enthroned. Accordingly, on 6 June 1719, after a reign of 3 months and six days, he was dethroned. Two days later his brother, Rafi ud-Daulah, was enthroned. Rafi ud-Darajat died of Tuberculosis or was murdered at Agra, 6 June 1719. His remains were interred near the shrine of Sufi saint Khawaja Qutbuddin Bakhtiar Kaki at Mehrauli in Delhi.

Ancestry

References

External links

Mughal dynasty genealogy

Mughal emperors
Darajat, Rafi ud
1699 births